The Carmichael House, known also as Raines-Carmichael House, Raines-Miller-Carmichael House or Cadwalader Raines House, is a Greek Revival mansion at 1183 Georgia Avenue in Macon, Georgia, United States.  Built in 1848, the house is a nationally significant example of Greek Revival architecture, built and designed by local master builder Elam Alexander.  It was declared a National Historic Landmark in 1973.

Description and history
The Carmichael House is located in central Macon, at the northeast corner of Georgia Avenue and College Street.  It is a two-story wood frame structure, laid out in the form of a Greek cross, with Ionic-columned porches between the arms of the cross, and a large octagonal cupola rising above the center.  The corners of the cross arms have broad pilasters, rising to a full entablature and a dentillated cornice, with fully pedimented gable ends.  The central feature of the interior is a free-standing spiral staircase that rises all the way to the cupola, and several of the first-floor public chambers have columned niches.

The house was built in the late 1840s for Cadawalader Raines, a local judge, by Elam Alexander, one of Macon's most important master builders of the period.  The house is one of Alexander's most elaborate works, and is now among the best-preserved of his surviving works.  The house was described in Howard Major's Domestic Architecture of the Early American Republic as a striking and detailed example of Greek Revival architecture.  Cadwalader Raines died childless in 1856, and the house soon passed out of the family; it was owned in the 20th century by the Carmichaels.

See also
List of National Historic Landmarks in Georgia (U.S. state)
National Register of Historic Places listings in Bibb County, Georgia

References

External links
 

National Historic Landmarks in Georgia (U.S. state)
Historic American Buildings Survey in Georgia (U.S. state)
Houses completed in 1848
Houses in Macon, Georgia
National Register of Historic Places in Bibb County, Georgia